Santa Clara de Guapiles Airport  is an airport serving the village of Humo in Limón Province, Costa Rica. The runway is surrounded by the pineapple plantations of Piña Frut, S.A.

See also

 Transport in Costa Rica
 List of airports in Costa Rica

References

External links
 OurAirports - Santa Clara de Guapiles
 OpenStreetMap - Santa Clara de Guapiles
 HERE Maps - Santa Clara de Guapiles
 FallingRain - Santa Clara de Guapiles

Airports in Costa Rica
Limón Province